Cobija is a city in Bolivia, capital of the department of Pando, is located about 600 km (373 mi.) north of La Paz in the Amazon Basin on the border with Brazil. Cobija lies on the banks of the Rio Acre across from the Brazilian city of Brasiléia. Cobija lies at an elevation of ca. 280 m (920 ft.) above sea level and has a tropical and rainy climate.

Cobija has approximately 80,000 inhabitants, is the seat of a university and capital of the Bolivian Pando Department. Cobija has two airports and is connected by one road to El Choro in the Beni Department, which is not always passable during the rainy season. When the rain allows it, Cobija is connected to the rest of Bolivia also via road. Cobija is connected to Brazil by two bridges.

History
Cobija was founded in 1906 by Colonel Enrique Cornejo, originally under the name of Bahía and received its current name in 1908 in commemoration of the former Bolivian seaport Cobija on the Pacific, which has been a part of Chile since the War of the Pacific. In the early 1900s, Cobija experienced a boom as an India rubber industry center. When the industry collapsed, a major source of income being lost, Cobija became impoverished and its population fell.  Nowadays, Cobija is developing  again and its population is increasing. Currently, the region's primary industry is Bolivia nuts, although tourism and commerce are growing. There is a Free economic zone in the city, the largest in Bolivia.

Population
The inhabitants of Cobija has risen very strongly during the past two decades to more than five-fold. Currently the estimated population is as much as 80,000 inhabitants with a population growth of 6 to 8% per year.

Sports

The Estadio Roberto Jordán Cuellar is located in Cobija. The football stadium has a capacity of 24,000.

Climate
Cobija is classified as a tropical monsoon climate, Am in the Köppen classification system. Cobija has two distinct seasons, with a noticeable dry season and a wet rainy season fed by powerful thunderstorms, with hot temperatures year-round.

Gallery

Transportation
Cobija is served by major Bolivian airlines at Captain Aníbal Arab Airport and by buses to Riberalta. The Interoceanic Highway passes through the city of Cobija.

References 

Populated places in Pando Department
Populated places established in 1906
Bolivia–Brazil border crossings
1906 establishments in Bolivia